The 1997 First-Year Player Draft, Major League Baseball's annual amateur draft of high school and college baseball players, was held on June 2 and 3, 1997. A total of 1607 players were drafted over the course of 92 rounds.

First round selections

Supplemental first round selections

Compensation Picks

Other notable players 
Randy Wolf, 2nd round, 54th overall by the Philadelphia Phillies
Scott Linebrink, 2nd round, 56th overall by the San Francisco Giants
Tyler Walker, 2nd round, 58th overall by the New York Mets
Jeff Weaver, 2nd round, 62nd overall by the Chicago White Sox, but did not sign
Aaron Cook, 2nd round, 70th overall by the Colorado Rockies
Rick Ankiel, 2nd round, 72nd overall by the St. Louis Cardinals
Chase Utley, 2nd round, 76th overall by the Los Angeles Dodgers, but did not sign
Jeremy Affeldt, 3rd round, 91st overall by the Kansas City Royals
John Grabow, 3rd round, 92nd overall by the Pittsburgh Pirates
Scott Downs, 3rd round, 94th overall by the Chicago Cubs
Eric Byrnes, 4th round, 130th overall by the Houston Astros, but did not sign
Chone Figgins, 4th round, 132nd overall by the Colorado Rockies
Xavier Nady, 4th round, 134th overall by the St. Louis Cardinals, but did not sign
Derrick Turnbow, 5th round, 146th overall by the Philadelphia Phillies
Michael Young, 5th round, 149th overall by the Toronto Blue Jays
DeWayne Wise, 5th round, 158th overall by the Cincinnati Reds
Randy Choate, 5th round, 169th overall by the New York Yankees
Horacio Ramírez, 5th round, 172nd overall by the Atlanta Braves
Tim Hudson, 6th round, 185th overall by the Oakland Athletics
Mike Lamb, 7th round, 227th overall by the Texas Rangers
Cliff Lee, 8th round, 246th overall by the Florida Marlins, but did not sign
Scott Williamson, 9th round, 278th overall by the Cincinnati Reds
Toby Hall, 9th round, 294th overall by the Tampa Bay Devil Rays
Garrett Atkins, 10th round, 300th overall by the New York Mets, but did not sign
Michael Wuertz, 11th round, 334th overall by the Chicago Cubs
Jerry Hairston Jr., 11th round, 345th overall by the Baltimore Orioles
Joel Piñeiro, 12th round, 373rd overall by the Seattle Mariners
Ross Gload, 13th round, 396th overall by the Florida Marlins
Jeremy Guthrie, 15th round, 450th overall by the New York Mets, but did not sign
Jason Michaels, 15th round, 464th overall by the St. Louis Cardinals, but did not sign
Shawn Camp, 16th round, 500th overall by the San Diego Padres
Johnny Estrada, 17th round, 506th overall by the Philadelphia Phillies
David Eckstein, 19th round, 581st overall by the Boston Red Sox
Mark Hendrickson, 20th round, 599th overall by the Toronto Blue Jays
Tim Redding, 20th round, 610th overall by the Houston Astros
J. C. Romero, 21st round, 633rd overall by the Minnesota Twins
D. J. Carrasco, 26th round, 795th overall by the Baltimore Orioles
Mike González, 30th round, 902nd overall by the Pittsburgh Pirates
Nick Punto, 33rd round, 993rd overall by the Minnesota Twins, but did not sign
Alex Cintrón, 36th round, 1103rd overall by the Arizona Diamondbacks
Brandon Lyon, 37th round, 1110th overall by the New York Mets, but did not sign
Scot Shields, 38th round, 1137th overall by the Anaheim Angels
Orlando Hudson, 43rd round, 1280th overall by the Toronto Blue Jays
David DeJesus, 43rd round, 1281st overall by the New York Mets, but did not sign
Brad Hawpe, 46th round, 1344th overall by the Toronto Blue Jays, but did not sign
Chad Qualls, 52nd round, 1444th overall by the Toronto Blue Jays, but did not sign
Aaron Heilman, 55th round, 1488th overall by the New York Yankees, but did not sign
Heath Bell, 69th round, 1583rd overall by the Tampa Bay Devil Rays, but did not sign
Willie Harris, 90th round, 1605th overall by the Tampa Bay Devil Rays, but did not sign

NFL players drafted 
Javon Walker, 12th round, 366th overall by the Florida Marlins
Antwaan Randle El, 14th round, 424th overall by the Chicago Cubs, but did not sign
Marques Tuiasosopo, 34th round, 1023rd overall by the Minnesota Twins, but did not sign
Freddie Mitchell, 47th round, 1379th overall by the Tampa Bay Devil Rays, but did not sign

NHL players drafted 
Paul Manning 20th round, 619th overall by the New York Yankees

See also
Major League Baseball
Major League Baseball Draft
List of MLB first overall draft choices
Rule 5 Draft

External links
Complete draft list from The Baseball Cube database
MLB.com's section on the draft

Major League Baseball draft
Draft
Major League Baseball draft